Sveta is a village in the municipality of Demir Hisar, North Macedonia.

Demographics
Sveta is attested in the Ottoman defter of 1467/68 as a village in the vilayet of Manastir. The majority of the inhabitants attested bore mixed Slavic-Albanian anthroponyms, such as Gerg Kovaç.

According to the 2002 census, the village had a total of 332 inhabitants. Ethnic groups in the village include:

Macedonians 332

References

Villages in Demir Hisar Municipality